Under The Elephant (often abbreviated as UTE) is an American alternative band based in New York City. The band was formed in 2009 by solo artist Ben Jelen and former Deuce Project member Josh McMillan. The band's debut album, The Eleventh Hour was released on April 22, 2011. As of January 2012, the band is unsigned.

History 
Under The Elephant was formed in 2009 by Ben Jelen and Josh McMillan, former label mates at Maverick Records. The two were also joined by friends Lisa McMillan, Tina Mathieu Logie, Stan Esposito, Steve Esposito, and Jimmy Stull. Their first album, The Eleventh Hour was released in April 2011.

Members 
 Ben Jelen
 Josh McMillan
 Lisa McMillan
 Tina Mathieu Logie
 Jimmy Stull
 Stan Esposito
 Steve Esposito

Discography 
 The Eleventh Hour (2011)

References

External links

Musical groups established in 2009
Alternative rock groups from New York (state)
Musical groups from New York City